The history of the Jews in Iași dates back to the late 16th century, when Sephardi Jews first arrived in the city. Iași has been the center of Jewish life in Moldavia for centuries. Once home to a thriving Yiddish culture, the first Yiddish theater in the world was founded in the city. The city's Jewish community was devastated by the Iași pogrom of 1941; one of the worst massacres of World War II, over 13,000 Jewish people were murdered during the pogrom. Today, the community has dwindled and has between 300 and 600 members and two operating synagogues.

Contemporary community

The Iași Jewish community maintains two synagogues, including the Great Synagogue. The Great Synagogue is the oldest surviving synagogue in Romania and is listed on the National Register of Historic Monuments in Romania.

There is a Jewish hospitality house in Iași that caters to Jewish tourists. Open during the summer, the house helps tourists who are visiting the graves of tzaddikim buried in the region.

Notable Jews from Iași
Sorel Etrog, a Romanian-born Israeli-Canadian artist, writer, philosopher, and sculptor.
Rita Klímová, a Romanian-born Czech economist and politician.
Magda Lupescu, the mistress and later wife of King Carol II of Romania.
Bernard Natan, a French-Romanian film entrepreneur, director and actor of the 1920s and 1930s.
Lupu Pick, a German actor, film director, producer, and screenwriter of the silent era.
Émile Natan, a Romanian-born French film producer.
Arthur Segal, an artist and author.
Iancu Țucărman, an agricultural engineer and survivor of the Holocaust and the Iași pogrom.
David Twersky, the Rebbe of the Skverer Hasidism.
Zeydl Shmuel-Yehuda Helman, an actor, songwriter, journalist, and educator.

See also
Great Synagogue (Iași)
Gruber's Journey
History of the Jews in Bessarabia
History of the Jews in Moldova
History of the Jews in Romania
Iași pogrom
Pod Roșu Synagogue
Victims of Iași Pogrom Monument
Der Wecker

References

Ashkenazi Jewish culture in Romania
Jewish Romanian history
 
Sephardi Jewish culture in Romania